As an important part of the national sustainable development strategy, the development of advanced materials is advancing the competitive nature and state of the art for Chinese industry. The State has put advanced materials high on its development agenda for the next decade and listed it among the key high-tech industry sectors that would be given priority for development by the State Council. At present, the pace of building China's advanced materials industry is accelerating. Advanced materials have been key fields in China's national R&D system (National High Technology Research and Development Program (863 Program) and National Basic Research Program (973 Program)).

R&D leaders
Shanghai Institute of Ceramics, Chinese Academy of Sciences
State Key Laboratory of High Performance Ceramics and Superfine Microstructures
National Engineering Research Center for Biomaterials
National Industrial Ceramics Engineering Technology Center
The State Key Lab of New Ceramics and Fine Processing

Domestic leaders
Dongxin Seals Co., Ltd
Zibo HuaChuang Fine Ceramics Co., Ltd
Shenzhen Upcera Co., Ltd
Yixing Nonmetallic Chemical Machinery Factory
Sinoma Advanced Materials Co., Ltd.
Beijing Tsinghua Unisplendor Founder High-Tech Ceramics Co. Ltd
Beijing Trend Aofu Fine Ceramics Co., Ltd.
Elite Ceramic (Beijing) Co., Ltd
Shenyang Starlight Advanced Ceramics Co., Ltd
Fenghua Feigu Kaiheng Seal Technologies Co., Ltd.
Luoyang Bearing Science and Technology Co., Ltd.
Yixing Haldenwanger Fine Ceramic Co., Ltd.
Shandong Far East High-technological Material Co., Ltd.
Zibo GT Industrial Ceramics Co., Ltd.
Wuxi Murata Electronics Co., Ltd.
Guangdong Jin Gang New Materials Co., Ltd.
Dalian Dayou Advanced Ceramic Co., Ltd.
Fenghua Advanced Technology (Holding) Co., Ltd
Zhejiang Jiakang Electronics Co., Ltd
Jiangsu Jiangjia Electronics Co., Ltd.
Jiangsu Baotong Electronic & Technology Co., Ltd
Chengdu Hongming Electronics Co., Ltd.
Zhejiang Zhengyuan Electric Co., Ltd.
Chaozhou Three-Circle (Group) Co., Ltd
Leatec Fine Ceramics (Kunshan) Co., Ltd.
Shanghai Bio-lu Biomaterials Co., Ltd
National Engineering Research Center for Biomaterials
Hunan Gongchuang Bio-functional Materials Co., Ltd.
Wuhan Huawei Bio Materials Engineering Development Co., Ltd.

International leaders
Saint-Gobain Zirpro (Handan) Co., Ltd
Shanghai Nicera Sensor Co., Ltd
Shanghai KYOCERA Electronics Co., Ltd.
Weifang Huamei Fine Ceramics Co., Ltd
Germany FCT (Tangshan) Technical Ceramics Co., Ltd
Corning Shanghai Co., Ltd

See also
Advanced Materials journal
Materials science

Industry in China